Scott Douglas Sheffield (born 1952/53) is an American businessman and president and chief executive officer (CEO) of Pioneer Natural Resources Company.

Early life
Sheffield received a bachelor's degree in petroleum engineering from the University of Texas.

Career
Sheffield became a director of Pioneer Natural Resources in August 1997, when he became the company's founding CEO. He had been an executive officer of one of its predecessors, Parker & Parsley Petroleum Co., since 1989.

Sheffield joined Parker & Parsley as a petroleum engineer in 1979 and was promoted to vice president-engineering in September 1981, elected president and a director in April 1985, and became chairman of the board and CEO on Jan. 19, 1989.

Before joining Parker & Parsley, Sheffield was a production and reservoir engineer for Amoco Production Co.

At the end of 2016, he retired as CEO to a 2,300-acre ranch near Santa Fe, New Mexico, that he purchased from Jane Fonda.

On Jan. 1, 2017, he was succeeded by Timothy Dove as CEO.

Sheffield held the position of Executive Chairman of Pioneer through 2017, retiring entirely at year-end 2017.

In February 2019, he returned to Pioneer as President & CEO upon the retirement of successor CEO Timothy Dove.

He is on the advisory board of L1 Energy.

Personal life
Sheffield is married to Kimberly, they have five children, and live in Irving, Texas.

References

1950s births
American chief executives
Living people